Farglitazar is a peroxisome proliferator-activated receptor agonist which was formerly under development by GlaxoSmithKline, but has never been marketed.  It progressed to phase II clinical trials for the treatment of hepatic fibrosis, but failed to show efficacy. After reaching phase III for type 2 diabetes, further development was discontinued.

References 

GSK plc brands
PPAR agonists
Oxazoles
Abandoned drugs